The Roman Catholic Diocese of Saint-Denis in Île-de-France (Latin: Dioecesis Sancti Dionysii in Francia; French: Diocèse de Saint-Denis-en-France) is a diocese of the Latin Church of the Roman Catholic Church in France. Erected in 1966 by Pope Paul VI, the diocese was split off from the Archdiocese of Paris and the Diocese of Versailles.  Its territory comprises the department of Seine-Saint-Denis. As of 2011, the diocese remains a suffragan of the  Archdiocese of Paris.

Ordinaries 
Jacques Le Cordier † (9 Oct 1966 Appointed – 1 Apr 1978 Retired) 
Guy Gérard Deroubaix † (1 Apr 1978 Succeeded – 8 Jan 1996 Died)
Olivier Jean-Marie Michel de Berranger, Ist. del Prado † (6 Sep 1996 – 15 Jan 2009)
Pascal Michel Ghislain Delannoy (11 March 2009 – )

References

External links 
Official website 
Centre national des Archives de l'Église de France, L’Épiscopat francais depuis 1919 

David Cheney's Catholic-Hierarchy site

Saint-Denis
1966 establishments in France